Consensus division may refer to:

Exact division, a division of a resource to two or more subsets such that all people agree on the values of the subsets.
Consensus decision-making, a division of a resource among several people, such that all of them accept the division without dispute.
In American college football, a consensus division champion is the winner of a division chosen by a rule using various votes rather than by a tournament.